This is a list of the largest mining companies  in terms of revenue (in US billion dollars) as ranked by Statista in 2019.

See also
List of largest coal mining companies
List of largest manufacturing companies by revenue
List of public corporations by market capitalization
List of largest chemical producers

References

External links
statista website
Vale S.A.. (2020). VALE’S PERFORMANCE IN 4Q20 AND 2020. http://www.vale.com/en/investors/information-market/quarterly-results/quarterlyresultsdocs/vale_ifrs_4q20_i%20v20210225_vf.pdf

 
Economy-related lists of superlatives
Mining
Companies by revenue